Mexithauma quadripaludium is a species of freshwater snail, an aquatic gastropod mollusk in the family Hydrobiidae.

Distribution 
This species is endemic to Cuatro Ciénegas valley, in the Chihuahuan Desert, Mexico.

Ecology 
Predators of Mexithauma quadripaludium include the cichlid fish Herichthys minckleyi.

References

Hydrobiidae
Endemic molluscs of Mexico
Gastropods described in 1966
Mexican Plateau